Labeo pietschmanni is a species of fish in the genus Labeo. It is found in Indonesia.

References 

pietschmanni
Cyprinid fish of Asia
Freshwater fish of Indonesia
Fish described in 1930